David C. Cook is an American nonprofit Christian publisher based in Colorado Springs, Colorado. It was founded as a provider of Sunday school curriculum and remains a major publisher of such materials. It also publishes fiction and nonfiction books and distributes supporting materials like toys and games. Its best selling authors include Francis Chan, Gary Thomas, and J. Warner Wallace. For many years it published a Christian comic book, Sunday Pix, with stories about the adventures of Christian heroes in many different eras and in many parts of the world.

History 
An author and leader in the American Sunday school movement, David Caleb Cook, established the company in Chicago, Illinois, in 1875. He was motivated to provide affordable educational materials for children who had been left homeless in the Great Chicago fire.

Cook, who worked as a printer's devil in his father's print shop and as a volunteer in Sunday schools around Chicago, adjudged that most available Sunday school literature "suffered from either loose theology or poor design." With his wife, Marguerite, he established a newspaper, Our Sunday School Gem, to meet the need for good Sunday school literature before starting his eponymous publishing company. As the twentieth century began, the company moved to larger facilities in suburban Elgin. By the 1920s, the company produced more than 50 titles and had an annual circulation of two million.

The company moved its headquarters from Elgin to Colorado Springs, Colorado, in 1995. It did business under the name "Cook Communications Ministries" before reverting to "David C Cook" in 2007.

In September 2021, former Walmart executive John Aden, was named chief executive officer for David C Cook. Before joining David C Cook, Aden's 25 years of leadership experience spanned five continents and 28 countries at some of the world's top companies, including Walmart Inc., Mac Tools and Frito-Lay. Aden joined Walmart in 2007 as senior vice president of international operations. In 2011, Aden moved into U.S. Merchandising as senior vice president of Hardlines, and later that year was promoted to executive vice president of General Merchandising. Under his leadership, Walmart was awarded Retailer of the Year at the 2013 Consumer Electronic Show (CES). Prior to joining Walmart, Aden served as president of Mac Tools from 2000 to 2007. Before joining Mac Tools, Aden worked in a variety of positions in operations, marketing, sales and brand management for Frito-Lay from 1990 to 2000. He started his career with Frito-Lay after graduating from the University of Washington in 1990.

Acquisitions 
David C Cook acquired Kingsway in 1993, Scripture Press/Victor Books in 1995, and Integrity Music in 2011.

In 2015, David C Cook acquired assets from Gospel Light and Standard Publishing, including the Gospel Light Curriculum line, The Standard Lesson Commentary, HeartShaper, and Route 52 Curriculum from Standard, among other products. This acquisition positioned David C Cook as the second largest Sunday School curriculum publisher in the world, behind LifeWay Christian Resources.

In 2016, David C Cook Canada was bought by management and merged with Augsburg Fortress Canada.  It is now known as Parasource Marketing & Distribution.

Foundation 
David C Cook is a nonprofit publisher that uses the proceeds from its sales for global ministry. The David C Cook Foundation was founded in 1942 by Francis Kerr Cook “to aid and promote the work of religious education without profit to any person or group.” The projects of the foundation include providing the Life on Life curriculum and the Action Bible, translated into local languages, for children's ministry use around the world.

References

External links
Official website

Book publishing companies based in Colorado
Publishing companies established in 1875
Companies based in Colorado Springs, Colorado
1875 establishments in Illinois